Amblyocarpum is a genus of flowering plants in the daisy family described as a genus in 1837.

There is only one known species, Amblyocarpum inuloides, native to Dagestan in the North Caucasus, Azerbaijan, and Iran.

References

Inuleae
Flora of Azerbaijan
Flora of the North Caucasus
Flora of Iran
Monotypic Asteraceae genera
Taxa named by Carl Anton von Meyer